In approximation theory, Bernstein's theorem  is a converse to Jackson's theorem. The first results of this type were proved by Sergei Bernstein in 1912.

For approximation by trigonometric polynomials, the result is as follows:

Let f: [0, 2π]  → C be a 2π-periodic function, and assume r is a natural number, and 0 < α < 1. If there exists a number C(f) > 0 and a sequence of trigonometric polynomials {Pn}n ≥ n0 such that
 
then f = Pn0 + φ, where φ has a bounded r-th derivative which is α-Hölder continuous.

See also
 Bernstein's lethargy theorem
 Constructive function theory

References

Theorems in approximation theory